Borris is a townland in the civil parish of Roscrea in County Tipperary.

References

Townlands of County Tipperary